Thomas Creeks (1859 – 27 September 1917) was a New Zealand cricketer. He played in one first-class match for Wellington in 1886/87.

See also
 List of Wellington representative cricketers

References

External links
 

1859 births
1917 deaths
New Zealand cricketers
Wellington cricketers
Place of birth missing